The discography of Cash Cash, an American electronic music group, consists of five studio album, three extended plays and 32 singles. Their debut album, Take It to the Floor was released on December 23, 2008 and peaked at No. 31 on the Billboard Heatseekers Albums chart. Their second studio album, Love or Lust was released on April 19, 2011 and peaked at No. 169 on the Japanese Albums chart. Their third studio album, The Beat Goes On was released on September 7, 2012 and peaked at No. 163 on the Japanese Albums chart. Their fourth studio album, Blood, Sweat & 3 Years was released on June 24, 2016 peaking at No. 125 on the Billboard 200 and is certified platinum in South Korea. Their fifth studio album, Say It Like You Feel It was released on May 14, 2021.

Their hit single "Take Me Home" was released on July 15, 2013. The song peaked at No. 57 on the Billboard Hot 100 and sold 488,000 digital downloads. In 2016, the group released a single called, "Millionaire", collaborating with British DJ Digital Farm Animals and features American rapper Nelly for the song. In 2019, the group were featured in Pink's song "Can We Pretend". The song peaked at No. 1 on the Billboard Dance Club Songs chart.

Albums

Studio albums

Compilation albums

Extended plays

Singles

As lead artist

Other charted songs

Remixes and production

Notes

References 

Discographies of American artists
Electronic music discographies